Crenicichla igara is a species of cichlid native to South America. It is found in the Uruguay River drainage and in tributaries of the upper Uruguay River.

References

igara
Taxa named by Carlos Alberto Santos de Lucena
Taxa named by Sven O. Kullander
Fish described in 1992